New Faces New Sounds (Introducing the Horace Silver Trio) is the first studio album by American jazz pianist Horace Silver. "New Faces New Sounds" was a common name used by Blue Note label for the first albums of Lou Donaldson and Kenny Drew, among others.

Track listing
A1. "Safari" (Silver)	
A2. "Ecaroh" (Silver)	
A3. "Prelude to a Kiss" (Duke Ellington, Irving Gordon, Irving Mills)
A4. "Thou Swell" (Lorenz Hart, Richard Rodgers) 
B1. "Quicksilver" (Silver) 
B2. "Horoscope" (Silver)
B3. "Yeah" (Silver)
B4. "Knowledge Box" (Silver)

Personnel
Band
Horace Silver – piano
Art Blakey – drums 
Curly Russell – bass (tracks: A2, A3, B1, B3, B4)
Gene Ramey – bass (tracks: A1, A4, B2)

Production
Leonard Feather – liner notes
John Hermansader – cover

References

1952 debut albums
Horace Silver albums
Art Blakey albums
Blue Note Records albums